Black Sun Ensemble is a 1985 psychedelic rock recording by the Black Sun Ensemble. Originally issued privately, it was later reissued, most recently on Camera Obscura Records. Byron Coley writes in the liner notes to the Camera Obscure reissue that "It is difficult to think of a band that has ever produced psychedelic music that sounded even remotely like the original Black Sun's." It was symptomatic of the renewed interest in 1960s psychedelia evidenced by the Paisley Underground, 1980s garage rock revival bands, and Prince.

Track listing
Ruby Eyes of China (Acoustic Folk Song)
Heart Of The Sky (A Christmas Song)
A Chunk Of Mandolin Love (A Mother's Day Song)
Blue Thunder (Improvisation in the Key of A)
Dove Of The Desert (Blues in B Minor)
Ice Breaker (Fuzztone Guitar)
Golden Rays (Improvisation in C Scale)
Emerald Eye (Acoustic Folk Song)
Mandolin Winds (Chord Progression with John on Hand Drums)
Mayan Dance (Acoustic Guitar Solo)
Emerald Eye 2 (Wacko Guitar Solo)
Bleeding Heart (Blues for Hendrix)

External links
Fakejazz.com review

1985 albums